The 2012 The Bahamas Women's Open is a professional tennis tournament played on Hard courts. It is the second edition of the tournament which is part of the 2012 ITF Women's Circuit. It took place in Nassau, Bahamas between 12 and 18 March 2012. It offered the prize of US$ 100,000.

WTA entrants

Seeds

 1 Rankings are as of March 9, 2012.

Other entrants
The following players received wildcards into the singles main draw:
  Ryann Foster
  Simone Pratt
  Maria Sanchez
  Alexandra Stevenson

The following players received entry from the qualifying draw:
  Gail Brodsky
  Rika Fujiwara
  Karolína Plíšková
  Coco Vandeweghe

Champions

Singles

 Aleksandra Wozniak def.  Alizé Cornet, 6–4, 7–5

Doubles

 Janette Husárová /  Katalin Marosi def.  Eva Birnerová /  Anne Keothavong, 6–1, 3–6, [10–6]

References
 ITF Site
 Official website

The Bahamas Women's Open
Hard court tennis tournaments